The 2010 Pitch and putt European Teams Championship held in Lloret de Mar (Catalonia) was organized by the Federació Catalana de Pitch and Putt and promoted by the European Pitch and Putt Association (EPPA), with 8 teams in competition. Catalonia won their first European title.

Teams

Qualifying round

Final Rounds

Final standings

See also 
 European Pitch and putt Championship

References

External links 
 European Pitch and Putt Championship 

Pitch and putt competitions
2010 in Catalan sport